The 1935 Combined Scottish Universities by-election was a by-election held from 17 to 22 June 1935 for the Combined Scottish Universities, a university constituency of the British House of Commons.

Vacancy 
The seat had become vacant when the sitting Unionist Member of Parliament (MP), John Buchan had resigned his seat when he was appointed as Governor General of Canada. He had held the seat since a by-election in April 1927.

Candidates 
The Unionist candidate was 55-year-old John Graham Kerr, Regius Professor of Zoology at the University of Glasgow.  The Labour Party candidate was the novelist and poet Naomi Mitchison.  There was no Liberal Party candidate.

Neither Kerr nor Mitchison had previously contested a parliamentary election.

Result 
The result was a victory for the Unionist candidate, Prof. Kerr, who won over 80% of the votes.  He resigned his university chair, held the seat until the university constituencies were abolished for the 1950 general election.

Votes

See also
Combined Scottish Universities (UK Parliament constituency)
1927 Combined Scottish Universities by-election
1934 Combined Scottish Universities by-election
1936 Combined Scottish Universities by-election
1938 Combined Scottish Universities by-election
1945 Combined Scottish Universities by-election
1946 Combined Scottish Universities by-election
List of United Kingdom by-elections (1931–1950)

Sources 

1935 elections in the United Kingdom
1935 in Scotland
1930s elections in Scotland
June 1935 events
By-elections to the Parliament of the United Kingdom in the Combined Scottish Universities